Raadio 2 is Estonian radio station. It belongs to Estonian Public Broadcasting (formerly Estonian Radio) and started broadcasting on 1 May 1993.

History
In the course of the radio reform, Vikerraadio was merged with the I program (the name remained the I program). A new Estonian Radio station started operating on the frequency of program II - a self-sustaining commercial station aimed at young people, Raadio 2, which was broadcast for the first time from the 10th floor of the new Radio Building on May 1, 1993. The fourth station became the Russian-language Raadio 4, which started at the same time as R2. In 1995, program I became the more modern Vikerradio and the deep culture-oriented Klassikaradio from the III program. 

On 18 June 1997, Raadio 2 started to broadcast its radio programs via the internet.

References

External links

Raadio 2 - esimene saatepäev 1. mail 1993 kell 10.15 - 11.30

Eesti Rahvusringhääling
Radio stations in Estonia
Radio stations established in 1993
1993 establishments in Estonia
Mass media in Tallinn